Truth Unveiled by Time may refer to:

 Truth Unveiled by Time (Bernini), a 1646–52 sculpture by Gian Lorenzo Bernini
 Time Reveals the Truth, a 1650 painting by Theodoor van Thulden
 Time Reveals the Truth: The Allegory, a 1657 painting by Theodoor van Thulden
 Vanitas: Time Reveals the Truth, a  c.1670 painting by Gian Domenico Cerrini
 Time Revealing Truth, late seventeenth- or early eighteenth-century painting by Sebastiano Ricci Belluno
 Time Unveiling Truth (Tiepolo), a 1745–50 painting by Giovanni Battista Tiepolo
 Time Unveiling Truth, a 1733 painting by Jean-François De Troy
 Time Unveiling Truth, a c.1743 painting by Giambattista Tiepolo
 Time Uncovering Truth, a 1745 painting by Charles-Joseph Natoire